Kepler-37c is an extrasolar planet (exoplanet) discovered by the Kepler space telescope in February 2013. With an orbital period of 21 days, it is located 209 light years away, in the constellation Lyra.

See also
List of planets discovered by the Kepler spacecraft

References

Exoplanets discovered in 2013
37c
Lyra (constellation)
Terrestrial planets
Transiting exoplanets
Kepler-37